The 1983 All-Ireland Senior Ladies' Football Championship Final was the tenth All-Ireland Final and the deciding match of the 1983 All-Ireland Senior Ladies' Football Championship, an inter-county ladies' Gaelic football tournament for the top teams in Ireland.

Wexford led at half-time but Kerry fought back to draw level with seven minutes to go, and won by 8 points in the end.

References

!
All-Ireland Senior Ladies' Football Championship Finals
Kerry county ladies' football team matches
Wexford county ladies' football team matches
All-Ireland